Jean Louis François (2 November 1882 – 10 January 1941) was a French philatelist who signed the Roll of Distinguished Philatelists in 1935. He contributed to the Kohl Briefmarken-Handbuch and was one of the founder members of the Académie de philatélie.

References

Signatories to the Roll of Distinguished Philatelists
1882 births
1941 deaths
French philatelists
Philately of France